Kherson TV Tower ( "Kherson TV Tower") was a  tall steel space framed truss communications tower located in the Ukrainian city of Kherson. The building was uniquely built, having been built by using the cross bracing system. The tower was a truss TV tower, specifically, a Vierendeel truss tower, wherein a structure's members are not triangulated but form rectangular openings instead (see Vierendeel Truss). The tower had an antenna that measured  and a roof that measured .

During the Russian invasion of Ukraine, the tower was destroyed by retreating Russian forces on 10 November 2022.

History 

Although the exact date of the commencing of the tower's construction is unknown, construction of the Kherson TV Tower was begun in 1991 and finished after 14 years, to be exact, in 2005, in the city of Kherson, in Ukraine. During the Russian invasion of Ukraine, the tower was destroyed by retreating Russian forces on 10 November 2022.

See also 

 Lattice tower
 List of tallest towers in the world
 Kherson
 Kherson Oblast
 Kyiv TV Tower

References

External links 
 
 Kherson TV Tower :: Mispedia
 Biology - Kherson TV Tower

Lattice towers
Towers in Ukraine
Buildings and structures in Kherson Oblast
Kherson
Towers completed in 2005